Ahn Jae-hoon  (born 1 February 1988) is a South Korean footballer who plays for Busan Transportation Corporation FC.

Club career

Ahn played in the University League when studying at Konkuk University from 2007 to 2010. Entering the 2011 K-League Draft, Ahn was drafted in the first round by Daegu FC. He made his professional debut in a 0–2 League Cup loss to Gyeongnam FC on 16 March 2011, and debuted in the K-League the following week.

References

External links 

1988 births
Living people
Konkuk University alumni
People from Pohang
Association football defenders
South Korean footballers
South Korean expatriate footballers
Daegu FC players
Suwon FC players
Gimcheon Sangmu FC players
Seoul E-Land FC players
South Korean expatriate sportspeople in Thailand
Expatriate footballers in Thailand
Ahn Jae-hoon
K League 1 players
K League 2 players
Ahn Jae-hoon
Korea National League players
Sportspeople from North Gyeongsang Province